Wang Qiang was the defending champion but chose not to compete.

Seeds

Draw

Finals

Top half

Bottom half

External links
 Main Draw

2015 ITF Women's Circuit